The following highways are numbered 479:

Japan
 Japan National Route 479

United States
  Interstate 479 (former)
  Louisiana Highway 479
  Maryland Route 479 (former)
  Puerto Rico Highway 479